Sthenopis purpurascens, the four-spotted ghost moth,  is a species of moth of the family Hepialidae. It was described by Packard in 1863. It is found in Canada and the United States, from Labrador and New York north and west to British Columbia and the Northwest Territories, south in the mountains to Arizona.

The wingspan is 66–100 mm. There are two color forms, a purple-grey and a yellow-brown form. The latter was previously thought to be a separate species, Sthenopis quadriguttatus. The forewings have a darker oblique median band, a darker terminal area and darker spots along the costa. There are two small, silver spots near the wing base. The hindwings are purple brown or salmon pink and generally unmarked.

The larvae feed on Populus, Salix and Alnus species. They bore into the roots of their host plant. The larvae have a cream-white body and brown head and reach a length of 50–60 cm. They need two years to complete their lifecycle

References

External links
Hepialidae genera

Moths described in 1863
Hepialidae